KACO (98.5 MHz) is an FM radio station licensed to Apache, Oklahoma, United States. The station is currently owned by Mollman Media.

KACO broadcasts a country music format to the Lawton, Oklahoma, area.

History
The station was first licensed in Ardmore, Oklahoma, and launched on June 24, 1974, as KRRO with a country format. On March 15, 1982, the station changed its call sign to KELS-FM and flipped its format to Top 40. On June 1, 1984, the station changed its call sign to KEBQ, and on February 2, 1987, to KRDM, retaining its Top 40 format during both call sign changes. By the early 1990s, the station's format went towards adult contemporary, but in October 1992, the station went silent. On October 15, 1995, the station returned back on the air after a three-year hiatus as KRXZ with a country format, and finally on January 6, 1997, to the current KACO.

On June 29, 2019, KACO signed off Superstar Country at 8:58 Local time with Gone By Montgomery Gentry and at noon started stunting with Blake Shelton Goodbye Time. On July 1, 2019, KA ended stunting and relaunched as "New Country 98.5".

References

External links
New Country 98.5 website

ACO-FM
Country radio stations in the United States
Radio stations established in 1974
Caddo County, Oklahoma
1974 establishments in Oklahoma